Sean Michael Rhyan (born September 15, 2000) is an American football guard for the Green Bay Packers of the National Football League (NFL). He played college football at UCLA.

Early life and high school career
Rhyan was born in Laguna Hills, California and grew up in Ladera Ranch, California and played mostly baseball and rugby as a youth. He attended Capistrano Valley Christian School before transferring to San Juan Hills High School in San Juan Capistrano, California after his first year. Rhyan was named the Male Athlete of the Year by the Orange County Register as a senior and played in the 2019 All-American Bowl. Rhyan also won the CIF Southern Section Division 1 title in shot put. He committed to play college football at UCLA over offers from Notre Dame, Alabama, and most schools within the Pac-12 Conference.

College career
Rhyan was named a starter at offensive tackle for the Bruins going into his freshman season. He started all 12 of UCLA's games and was named a Freshman All-American by the Football Writers Association of America and USA Today. Rhyan started all seven of the Bruins games in the team's COVID-19-shortened 2020 season.

Professional career

Rhyan was drafted by the Green Bay Packers in the third round (92nd overall) of the 2022 NFL Draft. He signed his rookie contract on May 6, 2022. He saw his first NFL action on November 6, 2022, playing a single special teams snap in a Week 9 loss to the Detroit Lions. On November 25, Rhyan was suspended six games for violating the league's substance abuse policy, effectively ending his season.

References

External links
Green Bay Packers bio
UCLA Bruins bio

Living people
2000 births
American football offensive tackles
UCLA Bruins football players
Players of American football from California
Sportspeople from Orange County, California
Green Bay Packers players
American football offensive guards